The Nobel Prize in Literature (here meaning for literature) is a Swedish literature prize that is awarded annually, since 1901, to an author from any country who has, in the words of the will of Swedish industrialist Alfred Nobel, "in the field of literature, produced the most outstanding work in an idealistic direction" (original Swedish: den som inom litteraturen har producerat det utmärktaste i idealisk rigtning). Though individual works are sometimes cited as being particularly noteworthy, the award is based on an author's body of work as a whole. The Swedish Academy decides who, if anyone, will receive the prize. The academy announces the name of the laureate in early October. It is one of the five Nobel Prizes established by the will of Alfred Nobel in 1895. Literature is traditionally the final award presented at the Nobel Prize ceremony. On some occasions the award has been postponed to the following year, most recently in 2018 as of May 2022.

Background 

Alfred Nobel stipulated in his last will and testament that his money be used to create a series of prizes for those who confer the "greatest benefit on mankind" in physics, chemistry, peace, physiology or medicine, and literature. Though Nobel wrote several wills during his lifetime, the last was written a little over a year before he died, and signed at the Swedish-Norwegian Club in Paris on 27 November 1895. Nobel bequeathed 94% of his total assets, 31 million Swedish kronor (US$198 million, €176 million in 2016), to establish and endow the five Nobel Prizes. Due to the level of scepticism surrounding the will, it was not until 26 April 1897 that the Storting (Norwegian Parliament) approved it. The executors of his will were Ragnar Sohlman and Rudolf Lilljequist, who formed the Nobel Foundation to take care of Nobel's fortune and organise the prizes.

The members of the Norwegian Nobel Committee that were to award the Peace Prize were appointed shortly after the will was approved. The prize-awarding organisations followed: the Karolinska Institutet on 7 June, the Swedish Academy on 9 June, and the Royal Swedish Academy of Sciences on 11 June. The Nobel Foundation then reached an agreement on guidelines for how the Nobel Prize should be awarded. In 1900, the Nobel Foundation's newly created statutes were promulgated by King Oscar II. According to Nobel's will, the prize in literature  should be determined by "the Academy in Stockholm", which was specified by the statutes of the Nobel Foundation to mean the Swedish Academy.

Nomination and award procedure 

Each year, the Swedish Academy sends out requests for nominations of candidates for the Nobel Prize in Literature. Members of the Academy, members of literature academies and societies, professors of literature and language, former Nobel literature laureates, and the presidents of writers' organisations are all allowed to nominate a candidate. It is not allowed to nominate oneself.

Thousands of requests are sent out each year, and  about 220 proposals were returned. These proposals must be received by the Academy by 1 February, after which they are examined by the Nobel Committee, a working group within the Academy comprising four to five members. By April, the committee narrows the field to around 20 candidates. By May, a short list of five names is approved by the Academy. The next four months are spent in reading and reviewing the works of the five candidates. In October, members of the Academy vote and the candidate who receives more than half of the votes is named the Nobel laureate in Literature. No one can get the prize without being on the list at least twice; thus many authors reappear and are reviewed repeatedly over the years. The academicians read works in their original language, but when a candidate is shortlisted from a language that no member masters, they call on translators and oath-sworn experts to provide samples of that writer's work. Other elements of the process are similar to those of other Nobel Prizes. The Swedish Academy is composed of 18 members who are elected for life, and until 2018 not technically permitted to leave. On 2 May 2018, King Carl XVI Gustaf amended the rules of the academy and made it possible for members to resign. The new rules also mention that a member who has been inactive in the work of the academy for more than two years can be asked to resign. The members of the Nobel committee are elected for a period of three years from among the members of the academy and are assisted by specially appointed expert advisers.

The award is usually announced in October. Sometimes, however, the award has been announced the year after the nominal year, the latest such case being the 2018 award. In the midst of controversy surrounding claims of sexual assault, conflict of interest, and resignations by officials, on 4 May 2018, the Swedish Academy announced that the 2018 laureate would be announced in 2019 along with the 2019 laureate.

Prizes 
A Literature Nobel Prize laureate earns a gold medal, a diploma bearing a citation, and a sum of money. The amount of money awarded depends on the income of the Nobel Foundation that year. If a prize is awarded to more than one laureate, the money is either split evenly among them or, for three laureates, it may be divided into a half and two-quarters. If a prize is awarded jointly to two or more laureates, the money is split among them.

The laureate is also invited to give a lecture during "Nobel Week" in Stockholm; the highlight is the prize-giving ceremony and banquet on 10 December. It is the second richest literary prize in the world.

Medals 
The Nobel Prize medals, minted by Myntverket in Sweden and the Mint of Norway since 1902, are registered trademarks of the Nobel Foundation. Each medal features an image of Alfred Nobel in left profile on the obverse (front side of the medal). The Nobel Prize medals for Physics, Chemistry, Physiology or Medicine, and Literature have identical obverses, showing the image of Alfred Nobel and the years of his birth and death (1833–1896). Nobel's portrait also appears on the obverse of the Nobel Peace Prize medal and the Medal for the Prize in Economics, but with a slightly different design. The image on the reverse of a medal varies according to the institution awarding the prize. The reverse sides of the Nobel Prize medals for Chemistry and Physics share the same design. The medal for the Nobel Prize in Literature was designed by Erik Lindberg.

Diplomas 
Nobel laureates receive a Diploma directly from the King of Sweden. Each Diploma is uniquely designed by the prize-awarding institutions for the laureate who receives it. The Diploma contains a picture and text that states the name of the laureate and normally a citation of why they received the prize.

Laureates 

The Nobel Prize in Literature has been awarded 115 times between 1901 and 2022 to 119 individuals: 102 men and 17 women. The prize has been shared between two individuals on four occasions. It was not awarded on seven occasions. The laureates have included writers in 25 different languages. The youngest laureate was Rudyard Kipling, who was 41 years old when he was awarded in 1907. The oldest laureate to receive the prize was Doris Lessing, who was 88 when she was awarded in 2007. It has been awarded posthumously once, to Erik Axel Karlfeldt in 1931. On some occasions the awarding institution the Swedish Academy have awarded the prize to its own members; Verner von Heidenstam in 1916, the posthumous prize to Karlfeldt in 1931, Pär Lagerkvist in 1951 and the shared prize to Eyvind Johnson and Harry Martinson in 1974. Selma Lagerlöf was elected a member of the Swedish Academy in 1914, five years after she was awarded the Nobel Prize in 1909. Two writers have declined the prize, Boris Pasternak in 1958 ("Accepted first, later caused by the authorities of his country (Soviet Union) to decline the Prize", according to the Nobel Foundation) and Jean-Paul Sartre in 1964.

Interpretations of Nobel's guidelines
Alfred Nobel's guidelines for the prize that the candidate should have bestowed "the greatest benefit on mankind", and writing "in an idealistic direction" have caused much discussion. In the early history of the prize Nobel's "idealism" was read as "a lofty and sound idealism". The set of criteria, characterised by its conservative idealism, holding church, state and family sacred, resulted in prizes to Bjørnstjerne Bjørnson, Rudyard Kipling and Paul Heyse. During World War I there was a policy of neutrality, which partly explains the number of awards to Scandinavian writers. In the 1920s "idealistic direction" was interpreted more generously as "wide-hearted humanity", and writers like Anatole France, George Bernard Shaw and Thomas Mann were awarded. In the 1930s "the greatest benefit on mankind" was interpreted as writers within everybody's reach, with authors like Sinclair Lewis and Pearl Buck being awarded. From 1946 a renewed Academy changed focus and began to award literary pioneers like Hermann Hesse, André Gide, T. S. Eliot and William Faulkner. From this era, "the greatest benefit on mankind" was interpreted in a more exclusive and generous way than before. Since the 1970s the Academy has often given attention to important but internationally unnoticed writers, awarding writers like Isaac Bashevis Singer, Odysseus Elytis, Elias Canetti, and Jaroslav Seifert.

From 1986 the Academy acknowledged the international horizon in Nobel's will, which rejected any consideration for the nationality of the candidates, and awarded authors from all over the world such as Wole Soyinka from Nigeria, Naguib Mahfouz from Egypt, Octavio Paz from Mexico, Nadine Gordimer from South Africa, Derek Walcott from St. Lucia, Toni Morrison, the first African-American on the list, Kenzaburo Oe from Japan, and Gao Xingjian, the first laureate to write in Chinese. In the 2000s V. S. Naipaul, Mario Vargas Llosa and the Chinese writer Mo Yan have been awarded, but the policy of "a prize for the whole world" has been less noticeable as the Academy has mostly awarded European and English-language writers from the Western literary tradition. In 2015 a rare prize to a non-fiction writer was awarded to Svetlana Alexievich.

Shared prize
The Nobel Prize in Literature can be shared between two individuals. However, the Academy has been reluctant to award shared prizes, mainly because divisions are liable to be interpreted as a result of a compromise. The shared prizes awarded to Frederic Mistral and José Echegaray in 1904 and to Karl Gjellerup and Henrik Pontoppidan in 1917 were in fact both a result of compromises. The Academy has also hesitated to divide the prize between two authors as a shared prize runs the risk of being regarded as only half a laurel. Shared prizes are exceptional, and more recently the Academy has awarded a shared prize on only two occasions, to Shmuel Yosef Agnon and Nelly Sachs in 1966, and to Eyvind Johnson and Harry Martinson in 1974.

Recognition of a specific work
Nobel Prize Laureates in Literature are awarded for the author's life work, but on some occasions the Academy have singled out a specific work for particular recognition. For example Knut Hamsun was awarded in 1920 "for his monumental work, Growth of the Soil", Thomas Mann in 1929 "principally for his great novel, Buddenbrooks, which has won steadily increased recognition as one of the classic works of contemporary literature", John Galsworthy in 1932 "for his distinguished art of narration which takes its highest form in The Forsyte Saga", Roger Martin du Gard in 1937 "for the artistic power and truth with which he has depicted human conflict as well as some fundamental aspects of contemporary life in his novel-cycle Les Thibault," Ernest Hemingway in 1954 "for his mastery of the art of narrative, most recently demonstrated in The Old Man and the Sea, and for the influence that he has exerted on contemporary style", and Mikhail Sholokhov in 1965 "for the artistic power and integrity with which, in his epic of the Don, he has given expression to a historic phase in the life of the Russian people".

Potential candidates 
Nominations are kept secret for fifty years until they are publicly available at The Nomination Database for the Nobel Prize in Literature. Currently, only nominations submitted between 1901 and 1971 are available for public viewing.

Criticism 
Although the Nobel Prize in Literature has become the world's most prestigious literature prize, the Swedish Academy has attracted significant criticism for its handling of the award. Many authors who have won the prize have fallen into obscurity, while others rejected by the jury remain widely studied and read. In the Wall Street Journal, Joseph Epstein wrote, "You might not know it, but you and I are members of a club whose fellow members include Leo Tolstoy, Henry James, Anton Chekhov, Mark Twain, Henrik Ibsen, Marcel Proust, James Joyce, Jorge Luis Borges and Vladimir Nabokov. [And, we might add: Virginia Woolf, 
Joseph Conrad, Anna Akhmatova, Ella Fitzgerald, and Eudora Welty.] The club is the Non-Winners of the Nobel Prize in Literature. All these authentically great writers, still alive when the prize, initiated in 1901, was being awarded, didn't win it." The prize has "become widely seen as a political one – a peace prize in literary disguise", whose judges are prejudiced against authors with political tastes different from theirs.  Tim Parks has expressed skepticism that it is possible for "Swedish professors ... [to] compar[e] a poet from Indonesia, perhaps translated into English with a novelist from Cameroon, perhaps available only in French, and another who writes in Afrikaans but is published in German and Dutch...". As of 2021, 16 of the 118 recipients have been of Scandinavian origin. The Academy has often been alleged to be biased towards European, and in particular Swedish, authors.

Nobel's "vague" wording for the criteria for the prize has led to recurrent controversy. In the original Swedish, the word idealisk translates as  "ideal". The Nobel Committee's interpretation has varied over the years. In recent years, this means a kind of idealism championing human rights on a broad scale.

Controversies about Nobel laureate selections 
From 1901 to 1912, the committee, headed by the conservative Carl David af Wirsén, weighed the literary quality of a work against its contribution towards humanity's struggle 'toward the ideal'. Leo Tolstoy, Henrik Ibsen, Émile Zola, and Mark Twain were rejected in favour of authors little read today.

The first prize in 1901, awarded to the French poet Sully Prudhomme, was heavily criticised. Many believed that the acclaimed Russian author Tolstoy should have been awarded the first Nobel prize in literature.

The choice of philosopher Rudolf Eucken as Nobel laureate in 1908 is widely considered to be one of the worst mistakes in the history of the Nobel Prize in Literature. The main candidates for the prize that year were poet Algernon Swinburne and author Selma Lagerlöf, but the Academy were divided between the candidates and, as a compromise, Eucken, representative of the Academy's interpretation of Nobel's "ideal direction", was launched as an alternative candidate that could be agreed upon.

The choice of Swedish writer Selma Lagerlöf as Nobel laureate in 1909 (for the "lofty idealism, vivid imagination and spiritual perception that characterizes her writings") followed fierce debate because of her writing style and subject matter, which broke literary decorums of the time.

During World War I and its immediate aftermath, the committee adopted a policy of neutrality, favouring writers from non-combatant countries. The pacifistic author Romain Rolland was awarded the prize for 1915. Other years during the war Scandinavian writers were favoured, or the award was postponed.

In 1931 the prize was awarded posthumously to the poet and former permanent secretary of the Swedish Academy Erik Axel Karlfeldt, who had died earlier that year. The prize was controversial not just because it was the first and only time the Nobel Prize in Literature was awarded posthumously, but because the Academy had previously awarded two other Swedish writers of the same literary era, Selma Lagerlöf in 1909 and Verner von Heidenstam in 1916. Internationally it was heavily criticised as few had heard of Karlfeldt.

The Nobel Prize awarded to Pearl Buck in 1938 is one of the most criticised in the history of the prize. The Academy awarded Buck "for her rich and truly epic descriptions of peasant life in China and for her biographical masterpieces", referring to acclaimed and popular books published only a few years earlier. But her later work is generally not considered to be of the literary standard of a Nobel laureate.

John Steinbeck received the 1962 Nobel Prize in Literature. The selection was heavily criticised, and described as "one of the Academy's biggest mistakes" in one Swedish newspaper. The New York Times asked why the Nobel committee gave the award to an author whose "limited talent is, in his best books, watered down by tenth-rate philosophising", adding, "we think it interesting that the laurel was not awarded to a writer ... whose significance, influence and sheer body of work had already made a more profound impression on the literature of our age".

In 1964, Jean-Paul Sartre was awarded the Nobel Prize in Literature, but he wrote declining it, stating that "It is not the same thing if I sign Jean-Paul Sartre or if I sign Jean-Paul Sartre, Nobel Prize laureate. A writer must refuse to allow himself to be transformed into an institution, even if it takes place in the most honorable form." Nevertheless he was awarded the prize.

Soviet dissident writer Aleksandr Solzhenitsyn, the 1970 prize laureate, did not attend the Nobel Prize ceremony in Stockholm for fear that the USSR would prevent his return afterwards (his works there were circulated in samizdat—clandestine form). After the Swedish government refused to honour Solzhenitsyn with a public award ceremony and lecture at its Moscow embassy, Solzhenitsyn refused the award altogether, commenting that the conditions set by the Swedes (who preferred a private ceremony) were "an insult to the Nobel Prize itself." Solzhenitsyn did not accept the award and prize money until 10 December 1974, after he was deported from the Soviet Union. Within the Swedish Academy, member Artur Lundkvist had argued that the Nobel Prize in Literature should not become a political prize and questioned the artistic value of Solzhenitsyn's work.

In 1974, Graham Greene, Vladimir Nabokov, and Saul Bellow were believed to be likely candidates for the prize but the Academy decided on a joint award for Swedish authors Eyvind Johnson and Harry Martinson, both members of the Swedish Academy at the time, and unknown outside their home country. Bellow received the Nobel Prize in Literature in 1976; neither Greene nor Nabokov was awarded it.

The award to Italian performance artist Dario Fo in 1997 was initially considered "rather lightweight" by some critics, as he was seen primarily as a performer, and Catholic organisations saw the award to Fo as controversial as he had previously been censured by the Roman Catholic Church. The Vatican newspaper L'Osservatore Romano expressed surprise at Fo's selection for the prize commenting that "Giving the prize to someone who is also the author of questionable works is beyond all imagination." Salman Rushdie and Arthur Miller had been strongly favoured to receive the prize, but the Nobel organisers were later quoted as saying that they would have been "too predictable, too popular."

The award to Camilo José Cela was controversial as he had moved voluntarily from Madrid to Galicia during the Spanish Civil War in order to join Franco's rebel forces there as a volunteer; at the time of the Nobel ceremony in Stockholm in 1989, an article by Miguel Angel Villena, Between Fear and Impunity, which compiled commentaries by Spanish novelists on the noteworthy silence of the older generation of Spanish novelists on the Francoist pasts of public intellectuals, appeared below a photograph of Cela.

A member of the Swedish Academy, Knut Ahnlund, who had not played an important role in the Academy since 1996, protested against the choice of the 2004 laureate, Elfriede Jelinek; Ahnlund resigned, alleging that selecting Jelinek had caused "irreparable damage" to the reputation of the award.

The selection of Harold Pinter for the prize in 2005 was delayed for a couple of days, apparently due to Ahnlund's resignation, and led to renewed speculations about there being a "political element" in the Swedish Academy's awarding of the prize. Although Pinter was unable to give his Nobel Lecture in person because of ill health, he delivered it from a television studio on video projected on screens to an audience at the Swedish Academy, in Stockholm. His comments have been the source of much commentary and debate. The issue of their "political stance" was also raised in response to the awards of the Nobel Prize in Literature to Orhan Pamuk and Doris Lessing in 2006 and 2007, respectively.

In recent years, the choices of Bob Dylan for the 2016 Nobel Prize in Literature and Peter Handke for the 2019 Nobel Prize in Literature have been heavily criticised.

Nationality-based criticism 

The prize's focus on European men, and Swedes in particular, has been the subject of criticism, even from Swedish newspapers. The majority of laureates have been European, with Sweden itself receiving more prizes (8) than all of Asia (7, if Turkish Orhan Pamuk is included), as well as all of Latin America (7, if Saint Lucian Derek Walcott is included). In 2009, Horace Engdahl, then the permanent secretary of the Academy, declared that "Europe still is the centre of the literary world" and that "the US is too isolated, too insular. They don't translate enough and don't really participate in the big dialogue of literature."

In 2009, Engdahl's replacement, Peter Englund, rejected this sentiment ("In most language areas ... there are authors that really deserve and could get the Nobel Prize and that goes for the United States and the Americas, as well") and acknowledged the Eurocentric nature of the award, saying that, "I think that is a problem. We tend to relate more easily to literature written in Europe and in the European tradition." American critics are known to object that those from their own country, like Philip Roth, Thomas Pynchon, and Cormac McCarthy, have been overlooked, as have Latin Americans such as Jorge Luis Borges, Julio Cortázar, and Carlos Fuentes, while in their place Europeans lesser-known to that continent have triumphed. The 2009 award to Herta Müller, previously little-known outside Germany but many times named favourite for the Nobel Prize, re-ignited the viewpoint that the Swedish Academy was biased and Eurocentric.

The 2010 prize was awarded to Mario Vargas Llosa, a native of Peru in South America, a generally well-regarded decision.  When the 2011 prize was awarded to the Swedish poet Tomas Tranströmer, permanent secretary of the Swedish Academy Peter Englund said the prize was not decided based on politics, describing such a notion as "literature for dummies". The Swedish Academy awarded the next two prizes to non-Europeans, Chinese author Mo Yan and Canadian short story writer Alice Munro. French writer Patrick Modiano's win in 2014 renewed questions of Eurocentrism; when asked by The Wall Street Journal "So no American this year, yet again. Why is that?", Englund reminded Americans of the Canadian origins of the previous year's recipient, the Academy's desire for literary quality and the impossibility of rewarding everyone who deserves the prize.

Overlooked literary achievements 
In the history of the Nobel Prize in Literature, many critical literary figures were ignored. The literary historian Kjell Espmark admitted that "as to the early prizes, the censure of bad choices and blatant omissions is often justified. Tolstoy, Ibsen, and Henry James should have been rewarded instead of, for instance, Sully Prudhomme, Eucken, and Heyse". There are omissions which are beyond the control of the Nobel Committee such as the early death of an author as was the case with Marcel Proust, Italo Calvino, and Roberto Bolaño. According to Kjell Espmark "the main works of Kafka, Cavafy, and Pessoa were not published until after their deaths and the true dimensions of Mandelstam's poetry were revealed above all in the unpublished poems that his wife saved from extinction and gave to the world long after he had perished in his Siberian exile". British novelist Tim Parks ascribed the never-ending controversy surrounding the decisions of the Nobel Committee to the "essential silliness of the prize and our own foolishness at taking it seriously" and noted that "eighteen (or sixteen) Swedish nationals will have a certain credibility when weighing up works of Swedish literature, but what group could ever really get its mind round the infinitely varied work of scores of different traditions. And why should we ask them to do that?"

Although several Scandinavians were awarded, two of the most celebrated writers, Norwegian playwright Henrik Ibsen and Swedish author August Strindberg were repeatedly bypassed by the committee, but Strindberg holds the singular distinction of being awarded an Anti-Nobel Prize, conferred by popular acclaim and national subscription and presented to him in 1912 by future prime minister Hjalmar Branting.

Paul Valéry was nominated twelve times between 1930 and 1945, but died just as the Academy intended to award him the prize in 1945.

James Joyce wrote the books that rank 1st and 3rd on the Modern Library 100 Best Novels – Ulysses and Portrait of the Artist as a Young Man – but Joyce was never nominated for the prize. Kjell Espmark, member of the Nobel Prize committee and author of the history of the prize, claimed that Joyce's "stature was not properly recognized even in the English-speaking world", but that Joyce doubtless would have been awarded if he had lived in the late 1940s when the Academy began to award literary pioneers like T. S. Eliot.

Argentine writer Jorge Luis Borges was nominated for the prize several times but the Academy did not award it to him, though he was among the final candidates some years in the 1960s.

Graham Greene was nominated for the prize twenty times between the years 1950 and 1966. Greene was a celebrated candidate to be awarded the prize in the 1960s and 1970s, and the Academy was criticised for passing him over.

French novelist and intellectual André Malraux was seriously considered for the prize in the 1950s. Malraux was competing with Albert Camus but was rejected several times, especially in 1954 and 1955, "so long as he does not come back to novel". Thus, Camus was awarded the prize in 1957. Malraux was again considered in 1969 when he was competing with Samuel Beckett for the prize. Some members of the Nobel committee supported a prize to Malraux, but Beckett was awarded.

W. H. Auden was nominated to the Nobel Prize in Literature ten times in the 1960s and was among the final candidates for the prize several times, but the Academy favoured other writers. In 1964 Auden and Jean-Paul Sartre were the leading candidates, and the Academy favoured Sartre as Auden's best work was thought "too far back in time". In 1967 Auden was one of three final candidates along with Graham Greene and the awarded Guatemalan author Miguel Ángel Asturias.

Controversies about Swedish Academy board members 
Membership in the 18-member academy, who select the recipients, is technically for life. Until 2018 members were not allowed to leave, although they might refuse to participate. For members who did not participate their board seat was left vacant until they died. Twelve active/participating members are required for a quorum.

In 1989, three members, including the former permanent secretary Lars Gyllensten, resigned in protest after the academy refused to denounce Ayatollah Ruhollah Khomeini for calling for the death of Salman Rushdie, author of The Satanic Verses. A fourth member, Knut Ahnlund, decided to remain in the academy, but later refused to participate in their work and resigned in 2005 in protest to the Nobel Prize in Literature awarded to Elfriede Jelinek. According to Ahnlund the decision to award Jelinek ruined the worth of the Nobel Prize in Literature for a long time.

2018 controversy and award cancellation
In April 2018, three members of the academy board resigned in response to a sexual-misconduct investigation involving author Jean-Claude Arnault, who is married to board member Katarina Frostenson. Arnault was accused by at least 18 women of sexual assault and harassment. He and his wife were also accused of leaking the names of prize recipients on at least seven occasions so friends could profit from bets. He denied all accusations, although he was later convicted of rape and sentenced to two years and six months in prison.  Sara Danius, the board secretary, hired a law firm to investigate if Frostenson had leaked confidential information and if Arnault had any influence on the Academy, but no legal action was taken. The investigation caused a split within the Academy. Following a vote to exclude board member Frostenson the three members resigned in protest over the decisions by the Academy. Two former permanent secretaries, Sture Allén and Horace Engdahl, called Danius a weak leader.

On 10 April, Danius was asked to resign from her position by the Academy, bringing the number of empty seats to four. Although the Academy voted against removing Katarina Frostenson from the committee, she voluntarily agreed to withdraw from participating in the academy, bringing the total of withdrawals to five. Because two other seats were still vacant from the Rushdie affair, this left only 11 active members, one short of the quorum needed to vote in replacements. On 4 May 2018, the Swedish Academy announced that the selection would be postponed until 2019, when two laureates would be chosen. It was still technically possible to choose a 2018 laureate, as only eight active members are required to choose a recipient. However, there were concerns that the academy was not in any condition to credibly present the award. The New Academy Prize in Literature was created as an alternative award for 2018 only.

The scandal was widely seen as damaging to the credibility of the prize and its authority. As noted by Andrew Brown in The Guardian in a lengthy deconstruction of the scandal:

King Carl XVI Gustaf of Sweden said a reform of the rules may be evaluated, including the introduction of the right to resign in respect of the current lifelong membership of the committee. On 5 March 2019, it was announced that the Nobel Prize in Literature would once again be awarded, and laureates for both 2018 and 2019 would be announced together. The decision came after several changes were made to the structure of the Swedish Academy as well as to the Nobel Committee members selection, in order to "[restore] trust in the Academy as a prize-awarding institution".

Similar international prizes 
The Nobel Prize in Literature is not the only literary prize for which all nationalities are eligible. Other notable international literary prizes include the Neustadt International Prize for Literature, the Franz Kafka Prize, the International Booker Prize when it was previously awarded for a writer's entire body of work, and in the 1960s the Formentor Prix International. In contrast to the other prizes mentioned, the Neustadt International Prize is awarded biennially. The journalist Hephzibah Anderson has noted that the International Booker Prize "is fast becoming the more significant award, appearing an ever more competent alternative to the Nobel". However since 2016 the International Booker Prize now recognises an annual book of fiction translated into English. Previous winners of the International Booker Prize who have gone on to win the Nobel Prize in Literature include Alice Munro and Olga Tokarczuk. The Neustadt International Prize for Literature is regarded as one of the most prestigious international literary prizes, often referred to as the American equivalent to the Nobel Prize. Like the Nobel Prize, it is awarded not for any one work, but for an entire body of work. It is frequently seen as an indicator of who may be awarded the Nobel Prize in Literature. Gabriel García Márquez (1972 Neustadt, 1982 Nobel), Czesław Miłosz (1978 Neustadt, 1980 Nobel), Octavio Paz (1982 Neustadt, 1990 Nobel), Tomas Tranströmer (1990 Neustadt, 2011 Nobel) were first awarded the Neustadt International Prize for Literature before being awarded the Nobel Prize in Literature.

Another award of note is the Spanish Princess of Asturias Award (formerly Prince of Asturias Award) in Letters. During the first years of its existence it was almost exclusively awarded to writers in the Spanish language, but in more recent times writers in other languages have been awarded as well. Writers who have won both the Asturias Award in Letters and the Nobel Prize in Literature include Camilo José Cela, Günter Grass, Doris Lessing and Mario Vargas Llosa.

The America Award in Literature, which does not include a monetary prize, presents itself as an alternative to the Nobel Prize in Literature. To date, Peter Handke, Harold Pinter, José Saramago, and Mario Vargas Llosa are the only writers to have received both the America Award and the Nobel Prize in Literature.

There are also prizes for honouring the lifetime achievement of writers in specific languages, like the Miguel de Cervantes Prize (for Spanish language, established in 1976) and the Camões Prize (for Portuguese language, established in 1989). Nobel laureates who were also awarded the Miguel de Cervantes Prize include Octavio Paz (1981 Cervantes, 1990 Nobel); Mario Vargas Llosa (1994 Cervantes, 2010 Nobel); and Camilo José Cela (1995 Cervantes, 1989 Nobel). José Saramago is the only author to receive both the Camões Prize (1995) and the Nobel Prize (1998) to date.

The Hans Christian Andersen Award is sometimes referred to as "the Little Nobel". The award has earned this appellation since, in a similar manner to the Nobel Prize in Literature, it recognises the lifetime achievement of writers, though the Andersen Award focuses on a single category of literary works (children's literature).

See also 

 The Big Read
 List of literary awards
 List of Nobel laureates
 List of Nobel laureates in Literature
 List of nominees for the Nobel Prize in Literature
 Lists of 100 best books
 Nobel Library
 Swedish Academy Nordic Prize
 World literature

References

External links 

 The Nobel Prize Medal for Literature –  Official webpage of the Nobel Foundation.
 Graphics: National Literature Nobel Prize shares 1901–2009 by citizenship at the time of the award and by country of birth. From J. Schmidhuber (2010), Evolution of National Nobel Prize Shares in the 20th Century at arXiv:1009.2634v1
 What the Nobel Laureates Receive – Featured link in "The Nobel Prize Award Ceremonies" on the official site of the Nobel Foundation.
 "The rise of the Prize" – Article by Nilanjana Roy dealing with the history of the award by decade, from the 1900s to the 2000s.
 Alternative Nobel literature prize planned in Sweden 

 
Literature
International literary awards
Literary awards honoring writers
Swedish Academy